William Pearce (1744–1820) was an English clergyman and academic, Master of Jesus College, Cambridge from 1789 and Dean of Ely from 1797.

Life
Pearce was born on 3 December 1744 and educated at St John's College, Cambridge. He was Public Orator of Cambridge from 1778 to 1788; and Master of the Temple from 1787 to 1798. In 1788 he was elected Fellow of the Royal Society.

Pearce was Master of Jesus College, Cambridge from 1789 until his death. He was also Dean of Ely from 1797 until his death.

He died on 14 November 1820.

References
 

1744 births
1820 deaths
Alumni of St John's College, Cambridge
Deans of Ely
Masters of the Temple
Masters of Jesus College, Cambridge
Fellows of the Royal Society